SW3 may refer to:

Samurai Warriors 3
Shadow Warrior 3
SW postcode area
Chelsea, London
Star Wars: Episode III – Revenge of the Sith
Kupang LRT station, Singapore